1992 Gamba Osaka season

Team name
Club namePanasonic Gamba Osaka
NicknameGamba Osaka

Review and events

Competitions

Domestic results

Emperor's Cup

J.League Cup

Player statistics

 † player(s) joined the team after the opening of this season.

Transfers

In:

Out:

Transfers during the season

In
Edivaldo (on November)

Out
none

References

Other pages
 J. League official site
 Gamba Osaka official site

Gamba Osaka
Gamba Osaka seasons